Shahzad Hasan (also known as Shahi Hasan), is a Pakistani musician, record producer, occasional actor, bass guitarist, backing vocalist and music industry executive. Co-founding the pop and rock band, Vital Signs, with keyboardist Rohail Hyatt in 1986, he earned recognition of playing bass guitar and as an original member of Vital Signs.

In addition to his role as the band's bass player and backing vocalist, he has undertaken many other roles for the band, such as producing and co-producing their albums, producing backstage music for the popular television series, Coke Studio. In Pakistan, he has been cited as one of the greatest bassist in the country as well as earned much respect in the country for producing the music. 

In 2003, he composed the song Mann Ki Lagan for the movie Paap, the lyrics being penned by Amjad Islam Amjad, the song that launched the Bollywood career of Rahat Fateh Ali Khan.

In 2013, he came recently came in the limelight after collaborating with various musicians to compose the Naya Pakistanand currently hosting the music competitive show, Cornetto Youth Icon on MTV Pakistan.

In April 2013, Hasan joined Meesha Shafi, String, Ali Azmat and Alamgir as a judge on the immensely popular singing talent show Cornetto Music Icons aired on ARY Digital.

Recently in 2017, he appeared as one of the judges in Pepsi Battle of the Bands season 2, he was the only judge retained from the earlier BoB edition back in 2002.

References

External links
 Shahi Hassan twitter page

Living people
Pakistani male singers
Pakistani bass guitarists
Coke Studio (Pakistani TV program)
Musicians from Karachi
Pakistani record producers
1967 births
Male bass guitarists